The 1967 Ireland rugby union tour of Australia was a series of matches played in May 1967 in Australia by Ireland national rugby union team.

It was a historic tour, seeing Ireland obtain its first test match victory in Australia.

Matches
Scores and results list Ireland's points tally first.

Touring party

Manager: Eugene Davy 
Assistant Manager: Des McKibbin
Captain: Tom Kiernan

Backs

Forwards

See also

References

Ireland
Ireland national rugby union team tours of Australia
1966–67 in Irish rugby union 
1967 in Australian rugby union
May 1967 sports events in Australia